Abramovka is a rural locality (a village) in Osinsky District, Irkutsk Oblast, Russia. The population was 247 as of 2012.

Geography 
Abramovka is located 9 km west of Osa (the district's administrative centre) by road. Maysk is the nearest rural locality.

References 

Rural localities in Irkutsk Oblast